Halki (alternatively Chalce or Chalki) is a Greek island and municipality in the Dodecanese archipelago in the Aegean Sea, some  west of Rhodes. It is part of the Rhodes regional unit. It has a permanent population of 330 (increased during the summer months), concentrated in the only village Emporio. The 2011 census showed a population of 478 inhabitants. The community is divided in two parts, Chorio (Χωριό, also spelled Horio, "Village") and Emporio (Εμποριό, "Market").

History 
The island supported a much larger population but following emigration in the mid-20th century Chorio was almost completely abandoned. A sizable group of the residents moved to Tarpon Springs, Florida, establishing the Greek-American community there that continues to this day.  A ruined medieval castle of the Knights of St. John overlooks the old town and the chapel contains some of the original frescoes.

List of Halki rulers

Municipality 

The island's primary industry is tourism, although fishing is also substantial. There is virtually no natural water supply on the island and rainfall is collected in large cisterns. Drinking water is brought in from Rhodes, but there can be shortages during the summer months due to the increased population.  there is a desalination plant on the island and the water boat no longer comes every few days. However, bottled water still arrives.

People
Dimitris Kremastinos (1942–2020), former Greek Minister of Health (1993–1996)

References

Further reading
Maria Z. Sigala, Ckalke from the Early Christian Period to the End of the Period of the Knights (5th century - 1523): Monuments, Architecture, Topography, Society, Athens 2011 (unpublished doctoral thesis).
Maria Z. Sigala, "Kellia on Chalki in the Dodecanese. The date of the wall-paintings and their significance", Deltion of the Christian Archaeological Society 30, Athens 2009, 149-158 (in Greek with an English summary).

External links 

  

Dodecanese
Municipalities of the South Aegean
Populated places in Rhodes (regional unit)